Barbara J. King (born 18 August 1956) is professor emerita, retired from the Department of Anthropology at the College of William & Mary where she taught from 1988 to 2015, and was chair of the department of Anthropology.

Biography

Since 2011, King has written weekly for the National Public Radio blog Cosmos and Culture, which explores humans' relationships to each other, their environment, and the planet. Specifically, King focused often on the "inner lives" of intelligent animals like primates, the octopus, squid, pigs, and dolphins, arguing that humanity should consider how best to communicate and accommodate these species' lives without anthropomorphization or exploitation.

King also utilized the blog format to relate personal stories for a general audience, such as her treatment for uterine cancer (2013) and her retirement from active teaching (2015).

King has been a full-time science writer since 2015, publishing stories in Scientific American, book reviews in the Washington Post, and essays in The Atlantic.

King is a pescatarian, stating that she supplements her "almost-vegetarian" diet with occasional fish. She has also described herself as a "reducetarian".

Selected publications
 The Information Continuum: Evolution of Social Information Transfer in Monkeys, Apes, and Hominids. School of American Research Press, 1994. 
 The Dynamic Dance: Nonvocal Communication in African Great Apes. Harvard University Press, 2004. 
 Evolving God: A Provocative View on the Origins of Religion. Doubleday, 2007. 
 Being with Animals: Why We Are Obsessed with the Furry, Scaly, Feathered Creatures Who Populate Our World. Doubleday, 2010.
 How Animals Grieve. University of Chicago Press, 2013. 
"When Animals Mourn", Scientific American, July 2013.
Personalities on the Plate: The Lives and Minds of Animals We Eat. University of Chicago Press, 2017. 
Animals' Best Friends: Putting Compassion to Work for Animals in Captivity and in the Wild. University of Chicago Press, 2021.

Awards 

 2018 - World Science Festival Participant
 2013 - Tack Lecture Series
 1999-2002 - University Professor for Teaching Excellence, College of William and Mary
2002 - Guggenheim Fellowship

See also

 Animal communication
 Body language
 Emotion in animals

References

External links 

 
 Stories by Barbara J. King - Scientific American

Living people
1956 births
American animal welfare scholars
American science writers
American women anthropologists
Animal cognition writers
College of William & Mary faculty
Douglass College alumni
University of Oklahoma alumni
20th-century American anthropologists
20th-century American non-fiction writers
20th-century American women writers
21st-century American anthropologists
21st-century American non-fiction writers
21st-century American women writers